Dmitri Alekseyevich Sadov (born 21 March 1997) is a Russian football player. He plays for FC Chayka Peschanokopskoye.

Club career
He made his debut in the Russian Professional Football League for FC Solyaris Moscow on 20 July 2016 in a game against FSK Dolgoprudny.

He made his Russian Football National League debut for FC Fakel Voronezh on 22 July 2017 in a game against FC Dynamo Saint Petersburg.

References

External links
 Profile by Russian Professional Football League

1997 births
People from Moscow Oblast
Living people
Russian footballers
Association football defenders
FC Solyaris Moscow players
FC Fakel Voronezh players
FC Tyumen players
FC Veles Moscow players
FC Avangard Kursk players
Russian First League players
Russian Second League players
Sportspeople from Moscow Oblast